Eduard Văluță (born 9 April 1979) is a Moldovan former professional football defender, who played for Persepam MU in the Indonesia Super League.

References

External links

1979 births
Living people
Moldovan footballers
Moldova international footballers
Moldovan expatriate footballers
Expatriate footballers in Russia
Expatriate footballers in Ukraine
Expatriate footballers in Belarus
Expatriate footballers in Kazakhstan
Expatriate footballers in Indonesia
Moldovan expatriate sportspeople in Russia
Moldovan expatriate sportspeople in Belarus
Moldovan expatriate sportspeople in Kazakhstan
Moldovan expatriate sportspeople in Ukraine
Moldovan expatriate sportspeople in Indonesia
Ukrainian Premier League players
FC Rostov players
FC Metalurh Zaporizhzhia players
MFC Mykolaiv players
FC Torpedo Minsk players
FC Nistru Otaci players
FC Dynamo Brest players
FC Naftovyk-Ukrnafta Okhtyrka players
FC Astana players
CSF Bălți players
Borneo F.C. players
Persikabo Bogor players
Association football defenders
Persepam Madura Utama players